Edgar Preston Ames (June 15, 1906 – July 20, 1983) was a famous Hollywood art director.

Ames first made inroads into Hollywood when he was a draftsman working on The Wizard of Oz in 1939. Within five years he had become a fully fledged art director.

In a career spanning nearly 40 years, Ames won 2 Oscars (for An American in Paris in 1951 and Gigi in 1958) and was nominated an additional six times.

Among the highlights of his career were creating the mystical town of Brigadoon in 1954, recreating the Titanic in The Unsinkable Molly Brown in 1964, mocking up an airport for the film of the same name in 1970 and reducing Los Angeles to rubble in Earthquake in 1974.

External links

American art directors
Best Art Direction Academy Award winners
1906 births
1983 deaths
People from San Mateo, California